Wibbel the Tailor (German: Schneider Wibbel) is a 1931 German comedy film directed by Paul Henckels and starring Henckels, and Wolfgang Zilzer. It is an adaptation of the 1913 play of the same title by Hans Müller-Schlösser. There are no copies of the film known.

Cast
 Paul Henckels as Schneider Wibbel 
 Thea Grodyn as Fina 
 Wolfgang Zilzer as Schneidergeselle Zimpel 
 Harry Berber as Mölfes 
 Ferdinand Hart as Heubes - Oberst der Schützengarde 
 Hermann Vallentin as Meunier 
 Hugo Fischer-Köppe as Stadtpolizist 
 Friedrich Ettel as Küfermeister Krönkel 
 Fritz Odemar as Fitzke 
 Maria Krahn as Frau Fitzke 
 Max Wilmsen as Pangdich 
 Gaston Briese as Knipperling 
 Albert Walter as Fläsch - Hausierer 
 Till Klockow as Hopp-Majänn 
 Ferdinand von Alten as Piccard 
 Wilhelm Graefe as Wirt 
 Josef Dahmen as Sohn des Wirts 
 Franz Stein as Nachtwächter

References

Bibliography

External links

1931 films
Films of the Weimar Republic
1930s German-language films
German films based on plays
Films set in Düsseldorf
Films set in the 1810s
Remakes of German films
Sound film remakes of silent films
German black-and-white films
1930s historical comedy films
German historical comedy films
1931 comedy films
1930s German films